The Zamacueca is an ancient colonial dance and music that originated in the Viceroyalty of Peru, taking its roots from Spanish, and Andean rhythms. Although currently the dance is not widely popular, several dance institutions in places such as Peru still dedicate part of their time to teaching Zamacueca.

Etymology

Legacy 
The popularity of the Zamacueca would eventually lead to it flowing out of its main region in modern-day Peru to other places in South America. The dance would slowly evolve as it took on new influences, but the basic steps and foundations of the dance remained almost the same.

In Peru, the dance would post-revolutionary times and take a series of adaptations especially from the coast of the country. Early on, two new styles developed: The Marinera Norteña and the Marinera Limeña. Although the dance never so much as "left" Peru, due to cultural and political reasons this new version of the Zamacueca (in reference to the Chilean Cueca). the broken ties between these two countries forced this new Zamacueca to indefinitely change its name in honor of the Peruvian Navy to the name of "La Marinera."

The Cueca is the Chilean version of the Peruvian Zamacueca. In Argentina, Zamba (artform) is related to the Zamecueca.

Revival

Choreography

Music 

The traditional music is Zamacueca

See also 

Dances of Peru
Latin American music
Música criolla
Music of Peru

Notes

References

External links 

Peruvian dances
16th-century music genres